Haplography (from Greek: haplo- 'single' + -graphy 'writing'), also known as lipography, is a scribal or typographical error where a letter or group of letters that should be written twice is written once. It is not to be confused with haplology, where a phoneme is omitted to prevent two similar sounds from occurring consecutively: the former is a textual error, while the latter is a phonological process. 

In English, a common haplographical mistake is the rendering of consecutive letters between morphemes as a single letter. Many commonly misspelled words have this form. The etymology of the word misspell is the affix "mis-" plus the root "spell", their bound morpheme has two consecutive ss, one of which is often erroneously omitted. The opposite of haplography is dittography. 

Other examples of words liable to be written haplographically in different languages are: German Rollladen ("shutters", from roll + Laden) which requires an uncommon sequence of three l‘s and is often spelt , or Arabic takyīf  ("air conditioning"), which would require a sequence of two semivowels y (one as a true semivowel, and another as a device to mark long ī) and is often misspelt as takīf , with only one.

The term haplography is commonly used in the field of textual criticism to refer to the phenomenon of a scribe's, copyist's or translator's inadvertently skipping from one word or phrase to a similar word or phrase further on in the text, and omitting everything in between. It is considered to be a form of parablepsis.

References

Textual scholarship
Typography
Biblical criticism
Proofreading
Textual criticism